Vertelka is a village in Ternopil Raion in Ternopil Oblast (province) of western Ukraine. It belongs to Ternopil urban hromada, one of the hromadas of Ukraine.

The khutors of Dubyna, Zaboloto and Zahrebellia belong to the village. Located on the left bank of the Seret.

History
The first written mention is in 1546, later mentioned in 1724.

There is a church of St. Great Martyr Yuriy (1920; reconstructed in 1992), cross in honor of the abolition of serfdom (restored in 1991).

Until 18 July 2020, Vertelka belonged to Zboriv Raion. The raion was abolished in July 2020 as part of the administrative reform of Ukraine, which reduced the number of raions of Ternopil Oblast to three. The area of Zboriv Raion was merged into Ternopil Raion.

Population
Population in 2003: 377 inhabitants.
Population in 2014: 344 inhabitants with over 110 houses.

Gallery

References

Notes

Sources

External links

Ternopil urban hromada
Villages in Ternopil Raion